The GI Film Festival (GIFF), a 501c3 non-profit organization founded by Army veteran Laura Law-Millett and her husband Brandon Millett, is "dedicated to preserving the stories of American veterans past and present through film, television and live special events."

GIFF's flagship festival is held each May during Armed Forces Month in Washington, D.C. GIFF also hosts an annual west coast festival each October in San Diego in partnership with KPBS. Festival events have included screenings, panels, Q&As, concerts, parties, raffles, game nights and gala awards ceremonies.

GIFF has also produced a live event military base tour, a National Cinematic Salute to the Troops showcased in 400 theaters across the country and a Best of GIFF television series on The American Heroes Channel and The Pentagon Channel.

Venues in the DC area have included the Embassy of Canada, the Anjelika Film Center at Mosaic, the Cannon House Office Building, the Howard Theater, the Carnegie Institution for Science and the US Navy Memorial Theater among others.

Venues in San Diego have included the USS Midway Museum, Balboa Theater, Village Theaters in Coronado, Ultrastar Cinemas and DoubleTree hotel in Mission Valley, as well as the Museum of Photographic Arts in Balboa Park.

Military-related films from other countries are also eligible for submission to the festival.

History 
The inaugural flagship event was held in 2007 over Memorial Day Weekend at the Ronald Reagan Building and International Trade Center.

The inaugural GI Film Festival San Diego event was held in October 2015 with the British film Kilo Two Bravo as the opening night film.

Notable Events

2007 
 General (Ret.) Richard Myers, former Chairman of the Joint Chiefs of Staff, hosted a special screening of Forrest Gump. 
 Actor Gary Sinise received the G.I. Spirit Award.

2008 
 Film screenings were presented by Hollywood actors and directors Gary Sinise, Jon Voight, Robert Duvall, James Franco and others. 
 A congressional reception honoring members of Congress who served in the military.
 Vince and Linda McMahon received the  "Corporate Patriot Award" for their philanthropic work on behalf of the American Armed Forces.
 An "Armed Forces Action Fest" featured World Wrestling Entertainment (WWE) stars and Buck Rogers star Gil Gerard.
 Panel discussions included "The 100 Greatest War Films of All-Time"; "War Stories", featuring Medal of Honor recipients; and "The Portrayal of GIs in Film and the Media".

2009 
 Valkyrie - opening night film
 Notable attendees: US Senator John McCain, Kelsey Grammer, Fred Thompson and Robert Duvall.

2010 
Notable appearances: Glenn Close, Bob Woodruff and the band Drowning Pool.

2011 
 Ironclad - opening night film (Q&A with producer Rick Benattar, and director Jonathan English).
Notable attendees: Gary Sinise, Lou Diamond Phillips (GI Spirit Award), and William Devane (GI Choice Awards),

2012 
Notable appearances: Ross Perot, Pat Sajak, Joe Mantegna (GI Spirit Award), Sally Pressman and Brian McNamara (GI Family Award).

2016 
Official Selections: The Finest Hours, Return to Dak To, The Last Man Club
Featured guests: Gary Sinise, Stephen Lang, J.W. Cortes, Dominic Fumusa.
Special Screenings: Top Gun, X-Men: Apocalypse.

2017 
 Notable attendees in DC: Judd Nelson
 On May 17, filmmakers Ken Burns and Lynn Novick presented over an hour of preview footage from his latest PBS series The Vietnam War at San Diego's Balboa Theatre. In attendance were several guests who were interview subjects in the film.
 On October 18, the west coast opening night film was The 2 Sides Project.

2018 

 Notable attendees in SD: George Takei, Jeffrey Wright

2019 

 Family Movie Night on the USS Midway

Award winners

2007 

 Feature Narrative: Divergence –  (dir. Patrick Donnelly).
 Documentary Short: Shakey's Hill (dir. Norman Lloyd).
 Best Short Feature: Old Glory – (dir. James McEachin).
 Feature Documentary: Speed & Angels – (dir. Peyton Wilson)
 Founder's Choice: Patriot Act – (dir. Jeff Ross).
 GI Spirit Award: Gary Sinise

2008 

 Feature Narrative: Soldier's Heart – Anthony Lover (Executive Producer).
 Documentary Short: Spitfire 944 –  (dir. William Lorton).
 Narrative Short: God and Country – (dir. Daniel Piatt).
 Feature Documentary Winner: Brothers at War – (dir. Jake Rademacher)
 Family Film: The Flyboys – (dir. Rocco DeVilliers)
 Founder's Choice: The Last 600 Meters –  (dir. Michael Pack).
 American Pride Film: SWIM – by Chantz Hoover.

2009 

 Feature Documentary - Perfect Valor
 Feature Documentary Runner-Up - Bedford: The Town They Left Behind
 Best Narrative Feature - Everyman's War
 Founder's Choice Award - The Triangle of Death
 Best Documentary Short - A Touch of Home
 Best Narrative Short - Witt's Daughter
 Best Student Film - Kapisa
 Best First Time Filmmaker - The Inheritance of War
 Best Military Family Film - Lioness
 Best Short Film - Looking Back

2011 

 Military Channel Award - Shepherds of Helmand, directed by Gary Mortensen
 Best International Film - The Telegram Man (Australia), by James Francis Khehtie
 Best Student Film - Thule, by Robert Scott Wildes
 Best Narrative Short - A Marine’s Guide to Fishing, by Nicholas Brennan
 Best Documentary Short - Last to Leave, by Pat Clark
 Best Narrative Feature - Flag of My Father, by Rodney Ray
 Best Documentary Feature - Patrol Base Jaker, by David Scantling
 Founder's Choice Award - The Wereth Eleven, by Robert Child

2012 

 Best Documentary Feature - Lost Airmen of Buchenwald (dir. Mike Dorsey)
 Best Documentary Short - Survive. Recover. Live (dir. Ivan Kander)
 Best International Film - Bridges:  A Living Graphic Novel (dir. Miguel Pate)
 Best Narrative Feature - Memorial Day (dir. Sam Fischer)
 Best Narrative Short - 8:46 (dir. Jennifer Gargano)
 Best Short Short - The Jockstrap Raiders (dir. Mark Nelson)
 Best Student Film - Stateside (dir. Jacob J. Tanenbaum)
 Founder's Choice Award -  (dir. Stephanie Argy and Alec Boehm)
 The Military Channel Award - The Borinqueneers (dir. Noemi Figueroa Soulet)

2013 

 Best Short Short - Fallout, (dir. Peter Carruthers)
 Best Student Film -  Choice, (dir. Michael Chan)
 Best International Film -  Gefallen, (dir. Christoph Schuler)
 Best Narrative Short -  The Fifth Horseman, (dir. Kari Barber (VFX Reel)
 Best Documentary Short - The Real Inglorious Bastards, (dir. Min Sook Lee)
 Best Documentary Feature - Honor Flight, (dir. Dan Hayes)
 Founder's Choice - 16 Photographs at Ohrdruf, (dir. Matthew Nash)

2014 

 Best Short Short - The Knee Deep Sailor (dir. Tyler Elliot)
 Best Student Film - Kingdom Coming (dir. Alex Fofonoff)
 Best International Film - Last Call (dir. Camille Delamarre)
 Best Dramatic Feature - Field of Lost Shoes (dir. Sean McNamara)
 Best Narrative Feature - Fort Bliss (dir. Claudia Myers)
 Best Narrative Short - Present Trauma (dir. Mark D. Manalo)
 Best Documentary Short - Travis: A Soldier’s Story (dir. Jonathon Link)
 Best Documentary Feature - Rickover (dir. Michael Pack)
 Founder's Choice - Riding My Way Back (dir. Robin Fryday and Peter Rosenbaum)
 American Heroes Channel Award - Forgotten Flag Raisers (dir. Dustin Spence)
 Best Original Screenplay - Christmas Leave written by David Brock
 Best Music Video - Nothing Real (dir. Reed Simonsen)

2015 

 Veteran Filmmaker Award (Short) - Day One (dir.  Henry Hughes)
 Veteran Filmmaker Award (Feature) - Haebangchon (dir. James William III)
 Best Student Film - Drone (dir. Justin S. Lee)
 Best International Film - Who’s Afraid of the Big Black Wolf (dir. Janez Lapajne)
 Best Short-Short - Beautiful Sunset (dir. Karen Weza)
 Best Documentary Short - The Next Part and Climb (dir. Erin Sanger and Ivan Kander)
 Best Narrative Short - Birthday (dir. Chris King)
 Best Documentary Feature - The Millionaire’s Unit (dir. Darroch Greer and Ron King)
 Best Action Feature - War Pigs (dir. Ryan Little)
 Best Narrative Feature - Kajaki (dir. Paul Katis)
 American Heroes Channel Award Winner - The MIAs on Tiger Mountain (dir. Norman Lloyd)
 Best Screenplay - Text Messages to God written by David Bryant Perkins)
 Founder's Choice Award - Nomadic Veterans and Battle Scars (dir. Matthew R Sanders and Danny Buday)

2018

2019 
San Diego:

 Best Actor: Frankie Muniz (The Black String)
 Best Actress: Scottie Thompson (#3 Normandy Lane)
Best Narrative Short: #3 Normandy Lane (dir. Brenda Strong)
Best Documentary Feature: The Donut Dollies (dir. Norm Anderson)
Best Documentary Short: Remains (dir. Joe Day and Jose Rodriguez)
Best Student Film: A Rodeo Film (dir. Darius Dawson)
Best First Time Filmmaker: Brenda Strong (#3 Normandy Lane)
Best International Film: Entrenched (dir. Joseph Chebatte)
Best Film Made By or Starring Veterans or Military: War Paint (dir. J.C. Doler and Taylor Bracewell)
Founder's Choice Award: Homemade (dir. Jason Maris and Danielle Bernstein)

2022 
San Diego:

Museum of Photographic Arts

 Best Documentary Short: Veterans Journey Home: On Black Mountain (dir. Frederick Marx)
 Best Narrative Short: American Hero (dir. Manny McCord)
 Best Local Narrative Short: My Happy Place (dir. Devin Scott)
 Best Student Film: BRAKE (dir. Aja Weary and Amanda Richardson)
 Best Actor: Evan Hall, Shell Shocked (dir. Paula Cajiao)
 Best Actress: Jomarla Melancon, Blood and Glory (dir. Satinder Kaur)
 Best Narrative Directed by Military or Veterans: THAT NIGHT (dir. Samuel Gonzalez Jr.)
 Best Narrative Starring Military or Veterans: Landing Home (dir. Douglas Taurel)
 Best Documentary Made by Military or Veterans: Walk With Frank
 Best Documentary Feature: Dear Sirs - (dir. by Mark Pedri)
 Local Choice Award: We All Die Alone (dir. Jonathan Hammond)
 Founders’ Choice Award: HERE. IS. BETTER. (dir. Jack Youngelson)
 Best First-Time Director: Ryan Mayers and Matt Mayers, Walk With Frank

References

External links
GI Film Festival Official Website
GI Film Festival San Diego
GI Film Group

Film festivals in Washington, D.C.
Film festivals in San Diego
Film festivals established in 2007